Henry St. Hill (1807–1866) was a member of the New Zealand Legislative Council from 31 December 1853 to 18 March 1856, when he resigned.

He was from Wellington and acted as returning officer for the 1853 Wellington provincial elections.

References 

1807 births
1866 deaths
Members of the New Zealand Legislative Council
19th-century New Zealand politicians
Sheriffs of New Zealand